Laabar Baari (Nepali: लाबर वारी; Burmese: Kyat Paung Chan ၾကက္ေပါင္ျခံ) is a village in Myitkyina ျမစ္ၾကီးနား, Kachin State ကခ်င္ျပည္နယ္, Myanmar and was early named laabar baari (လာေဘာ္ရ္ဘာရီ) by Gorkha but now it is called Kyat Paung Chan(ၾကက္ေပါင္ျခံ). It is located on the bank of Irrawaddy River ဧရာဝတီျမစ္. Laabar baari means a farm of rubber trees or land of rubber trees.

There live many tribes of people, like Gurkha, Burmese, Lishu and Rawan.  In Laabar Baari, there are two Gurkha Hindu temples, three Burmese monasteries, one Gurkha Buddhist monastery and five Lishu, Rawang  churches. Rampur, Myotitgyi, Khematiri, and Pammatti are the nearest border villages to Laabar Baari. There are more than 900 households and has population of more than 5400 people. There also has a post primary school located in the middle of the village and 'Happy water'factory beside Kyat Paung Chan Ward office.

Populated places in Kachin State
Ayeyarwady Region